Theodor Joseph Martin Kaes (7 November 1852 – 22 December 1913) was a German neurologist who was a native of Amberg.

Career
After his death, he was succeeded at Friedrichsberg by Alfons Maria Jakob (1884–1931).

Theodor Kaes was a pioneer in myeloarchitectonics, and is remembered for his morphological and myeloarchitectural research of the cerebral cortex, including the creation of cortical maps based on its fiber architecture. His name is lent to the eponymous "line of Kaes", which is a thin band of myelinated fibers located between the external granular layer and the external pyramidal layer of the cerebral cortex. This structure is sometimes called the "stria of molecular layer TA", or the "Kaes-Bekhterev layer", named in conjunction with Russian neurophysiologist Vladimir Bekhterev (1857–1927).

His principle written work was Die Großhirnrinde des Menschen in ihren Maßen und in ihrem Fasergehalt – Ein gehirnanatomischer Atlas (The cerebral cortex of humans in their dimensions and their fiber content. An anatomical brain atlas), 1907.

External links 
 UKE – Institut für Neuropathologie, Hamburg-Eppendorf Historical Outline of the Institute of Neuropathology
 The Cytoarchitectonics of the Adult Human Cortex
 Dorlands Medical Dictionary (definition of eponym)

German neurologists
1913 deaths
1852 births
People from Amberg